Kabisa Akili Maradufu Smith (born August 21, 1975) is a former American football quarterback. He was drafted by the Cincinnati Bengals in the first round (3rd overall) of the 1999 NFL Draft, the third quarterback in the first three choices, behind Tim Couch (Cleveland Browns), and Donovan McNabb (Philadelphia Eagles). He played college football at Oregon.

Smith also played for the Green Bay Packers, Tampa Bay Buccaneers, Frankfurt Galaxy, and Calgary Stampeders.

Early and college years
Given the name Kabisa Akili Maradufu Smith (in Swahili, "kabisa" means "completely", "akili" means "mind", and "maradufu" means "double" or "a Gemini twin") by his parents Glorida Bryant and Ray Smith, Akili Smith was born in San Diego, California. Smith attended Abraham Lincoln High School in San Diego, the alma mater of Marcus Allen and Terrell Davis.

Smith was drafted by the Pittsburgh Pirates in the seventh round (206th overall) of the 1993 Major League Baseball draft. He played for the Gulf Coast League Pirates of the Gulf Coast League from 1993 to 1994, and the Erie SeaWolves of the New York–Penn League in 1995.

Smith was named a Parade Magazine All-American and signed a letter of intent to play at San Diego State, but low test scores meant he had to attend Grossmont College, a junior college in the San Diego area for two years, prior to transferring to the University of Oregon.

Smith came to the foreground of draft discussions because of his performance in his senior season at Oregon, throwing 32 touchdown passes in 11 starts. He led the conference in passing yards and the entire NCAA in passing yards per attempt.  Smith was named second-team All-American and Pac-10 conference offensive player of the year.

Statistics

Professional career
In the 1999 NFL Draft, a year in which five quarterbacks were drafted in the first round, Smith was the third quarterback and third player selected overall, by the Cincinnati Bengals.

Cincinnati Bengals
Smith scored a 16 out of 50 on the NFL-administered Wonderlic test when he first took the exam in 1998. His agent Leigh Steinberg hired a tutor to help improve his score for the 1999 scouting combine, and he scored a 37 on the second try.

Prior to the draft, there was an effort by New Orleans Saints' head coach Mike Ditka and management to get the Cincinnati Bengals' high draft position so the Saints could get Ricky Williams. The final offer, which was refused by Bengals management, was for nine draft picks, several extra in that year as well as many the next year. Instead of taking the trade, the Bengals stayed with their initial decision to draft Smith, who, while athletic (he had also played two years of minor-league baseball and ran a 4.66 40-yard dash), was still largely unproven, having only succeeded at the college level for one season.

Smith missed a large portion of training camp during his rookie season in 1999 due to contract disputes. On August 24, 1999, he signed a seven-year contract worth up to $56 million with a $10.8 million signing bonus.

Despite showing athleticism in his early games, he failed to grasp the Bengals playbook fully and never established himself with the team. His offensive coordinator from 2001 to 2002, Bob Bratkowski, said Smith "wasn't as diligent as he should have been" regarding his film and playbook study habits.  During the four years he was with the Bengals, he started in only 17 games and threw just five touchdown passes and 13 interceptions, eventually leading to his release on May 31, 2003, after riding the bench mostly during the previous two years.

Later career
In 2003, Smith tried out for the Green Bay Packers, as Brett Favre's backup. He was, however, unsuccessful there and was later released. In 2005, he was released by the Tampa Bay Buccaneers after a stint in NFL Europe where he started four games for the Frankfurt Galaxy.

On April 28, 2007, Smith signed a two-year contract with the Calgary Stampeders of the Canadian Football League, where he was expected to compete for the starting quarterback position with another former NFL player, Henry Burris. After an unimpressive debut in an exhibition game against the Edmonton Eskimos, Smith played well in the final exhibition against the Saskatchewan Roughriders. Though listed going into the game as the third-string quarterback, he completed three touchdown passes in only one half of play, including one to former Kansas City Chiefs wide receiver Marc Boerigter.

NFL career statistics

Post-football career
After retiring from football, Smith was the quarterbacks coach for Grossmont College. Smith was a deacon at a Missionary Baptist church and played football for "God's House", a flag football team.

In March 2010, Smith joined the University of California's football staff as a graduate assistant to work with the offense. Cal head coach Jeff Tedford previously coached Smith at Oregon when he was offensive coordinator.

In 2012, Smith took over as quarterbacks coach for St. Augustine High School in San Diego. Smith planned to finish the college degree that he started at the University of Oregon. As of September 2014, Smith was coaching football for The Bishop's School in La Jolla, California, and was still 16 credits away from graduating from Oregon.

In June 2020, Smith was hired onto the coaching staff at Maranatha High School in Pasadena, California.

References

Further reading

External links
 Akili Smith at The Football Database

1975 births
Living people
Players of American football from San Diego
Players of Canadian football from San Diego
African-American players of American football
American football quarterbacks
Grossmont Griffins football players
Oregon Ducks football players
Cincinnati Bengals players
Frankfurt Galaxy players
African-American players of Canadian football
American players of Canadian football
Canadian football quarterbacks
Calgary Stampeders players
African-American baseball players
Baseball players from California
Gulf Coast Pirates players
Erie SeaWolves players
21st-century African-American sportspeople
20th-century African-American sportspeople